Astronomy for Dogs is the debut album of Scottish band The Aliens, released on 19 March 2007. It received generally positive reviews.

Track listing 
 "Setting Sun" (5:12)
 "Robot Man" (3:52)
 "I Am the Unknown" (5:28)
 "Tomorrow" (5:47)
 "Rox" (6:15)
 "Only Waiting" (5:24)
 "She Don't Love Me No More" (7:13)
 "Glover" (8:22)
 "Honest Again" (4:15)
 "The Happy Song" (3:57)
 "Caravan" (includes hidden track comprising piano from "She Don't Love Me No More" and vocals from "Honest Again") (16:21)

All songs written by Lone Pigeon aka Gordon Anderson

References 

2007 debut albums
The Aliens (Scottish band) albums